Multi-Dimensional Warrior is a compilation album by guitarist Carlos Santana. This album combines hits from his early career. It was released on October 14, 2008.

Track listing

Disc 1

Disc 2

External links
 Official website

2008 compilation albums
Santana (band) compilation albums
Carlos Santana albums